Wróblów  (German: Sperlingswinkel) is a village in the administrative district of Gmina Sława, within Wschowa County, Lubusz Voivodeship, in western Poland.

Wróblów village has a population of 196.

References 

Villages in Wschowa County